Boncath railway station served the village of Boncath, Pembrokeshire, Wales, from 1886 to 1963 on the Whitland and Cardigan Railway.

History 
The station was formally opened on 31 August 1886, although services began a day later, by the Whitland and Cardigan Railway. It was situated on the west side of a minor road on the B4332. On the up platform were the station master's house, the booking office and the station building. On the south end of the up platform was the signal box, which controlled the level crossing and allowed access to the goods yard, which had three sidings, a stone-built goods shed and a cattle dock. The station closed to passengers on 10 September 1962 and closed to goods on 27 May 1963. The station building survives as do the platforms, albeit in an overgrown state.

References 

Disused railway stations in Pembrokeshire
Railway stations in Great Britain opened in 1886
Railway stations in Great Britain closed in 1963
1886 establishments in Wales
1963 disestablishments in Wales